The Deodoro Olympic Whitewater Stadium is a whitewater paddling venue, constructed to host the canoeing and kayaking slalom events for the 2016 Summer Olympics in Rio de Janeiro. The stadium is part of the 'X-Park' sport complex (which includes BMX and Mountain Bike) located in Deodoro, Rio de Janeiro, Brazil.

Results of Olympic competition: C-1 men, C-2 men, K-1 men, K-1 women.

References
2016 Olympic venues 
Design history 
Deodoro X-Park

Venues of the 2016 Summer Olympics
Olympic canoeing venues
Sports venues in Rio de Janeiro (city)
Deodoro Olympic Park
Artificial whitewater courses